George Lamar Jones (12 May 1918 – 18 February 1997) was a United States Air Force flying ace during the Korean War, shooting down six enemy aircraft, with an additional shared victory credit, for a total of 6.5 victories in the war.

Early life and military career 
George L. Jones was born on May 12, 1918, in New York, New York, and moved to Titusville, Florida, during his youth. After completing college, he became a U.S. Army Lieutenant serving in the 22nd Infantry Regiment of the 4th Infantry Division. In 1941, he was assigned to the 97th Observation Squadron, and served in various stateside posts during WWII flying anti-submarine missions. In 1945, he was attached to the 21st Fighter Squadron and later the 34th Fighter Squadron where he was a flight leader on fighter aircraft missions during the Battle of Okinawa. During the Korean War, as a Lt. Col., he became America's 30th Jet Ace for downing 6.5 enemy MiG's.

Awards

Silver star 
The President of the United States of America, authorized by Act of Congress July 9, 1918, takes pleasure in presenting the Silver Star to Lieutenant Colonel George Lamar Jones (AFSN: FR-4325A), United States Air Force, for gallantry and heroism in aerial combat against an enemy of the United Nations as Pilot of an F-86 aircraft, 4th Fighter-Interceptor Wing, FIFTH Air Force, on 29 March 1953. While flying at 40,000 feet near the Yalu River, Colonel Jones, with his wingman, sighted two MiG's and made a right turn to intercept them. While making his move, four more MiG's were sighted in the formation, one of which moved under Colonel Jones in an attacking position. Skillfully maneuvering his aircraft, he dropped down and climbed under his would-be attacker. Utilizing his extensive knowledge of tactical gunnery, Colonel Jones closed to 800 feet and fired a burst that covered his target with hits, and caused a profusion of smoke and flame. As the MiG began to disintegrate, the enemy pilot ejected, as his flaming aircraft crashed to the ground. The tactical skill, and peerless gunnery Colonel Jones employed in attaining this distinction reflect great credit upon himself, the Far East Air Forces, and the United States Air Force.

Legion of merit 
The President of the United States of America, authorized by Act of Congress, 20 July 1942, takes pleasure in presenting the Legion of Merit to Colonel George Lamar Jones (AFSN: FR-4325A), United States Air Force, for exceptionally meritorious conduct in the performance of outstanding services to the Government of the United States as Commanding Officer, 51st Fighter-Interceptor Group, from 17 November 1951 to 10 January 1952. During that period, Colonel Jones led the 51st Group in successful operational activities against the enemy in Korea despite difficulties attendant to the conversion from F-80 to F-86 type aircraft. Although faced with seemingly insurmountable maintenance, supply and operational problems, Colonel Jones effectively utilized available personnel resources to expedite the entire conversion with high success. He implemented an effective Pilot Training and Refresher Course and successfully integrated a 100 percent change in personnel and equipment. Through his wide tactical experience, Colonel Jones contributed invaluably to the enviable operations record achieved by the 51st Fighter-Interceptor Group thereby reflecting great credit upon himself, the Far East Air Forces, and the United States Air Force.

Distinguished flying cross 
The President of the United States of America, authorized by Act of Congress, July 2, 1926, takes pleasure in presenting the Distinguished Flying Cross to Lieutenant Colonel George Lamar Jones (AFSN: FR-4325A), United States Air Force, for extraordinary achievement while participating in aerial flight on 1 October 1951 while leading a group formation of 31 F-86's on a combat aerial patrol in the Sinuiju-Yalu River area of North Korea. Shortly after arriving in the target area Colonel Jones' formation sighted a formation of 24 enemy MiG-15s high at nine o'clock and another formation of 16 MiG-15s at his two o'clock position high. As he prepared his formation to engage these enemy jet fighters Colonel Jones sighted a third enemy formation of approximately 12 MiG-15s below him maneuvering to attack friendly fighter-bombers engaged in interdiction bombing. Displaying exceptional judgment and leadership Colonel Jones dispatched one of his squadrons to engage the enemy formation at his nine o'clock position, then deploying his forces in an outstanding example of tactical utilization, led the remainder of the group in an attack on the enemy formation below him, although he realized that by doing so he would be subjected to an assault by the remaining flight of 16 MiG-15s. With brilliant airmanship Colonel Jones pressed so vicious an attack on the enemy formation beneath his that they were dispersed and forced to defend themselves. Almost immediately the second enemy formation dived to attack him. With coolness and skill Colonel Jones contained this attack and quickly gained the advantage, although outnumbered two-to-one. In the ensuing aerial battle, which raged for 25 minutes, Colonel Jones' group destroyed one enemy aircraft and severely damaged three others. Colonel Jones himself, maneuvered into an advantageous position on one of the enemy and with relentless skill and tenacity destroyed him. As a result of Colonel Jones' gallantry and leadership in the face of almost overwhelming odds the friendly fighter-bombers below were able to continue their assigned mission without interruption. Colonel Jones' action on this occasion has reflected the highest credit upon himself, his comrades in arms of the United Nations and the United States Air Force.

Distinguished flying cross 

SYNOPSIS: Lieutenant Colonel George Lamar Jones (AFSN: FR-4325A), United States Air Force, was awarded a Bronze Oak Leaf Cluster in lieu of a Second Award of the Distinguished Flying Cross for extraordinary achievement while participating in aerial flight in action against the enemy while serving as a Fighter Pilot with the 51st Fighter-Interceptor Group, FIFTH Air Force, in Korea from 1951 to 1952. His devotion to duty and courage under all conditions serve as an inspiration to his fellow flyers. His actions reflect the highest credit upon himself and the Armed Forces of the United States.

Distinguished flying cross 
The President of the United States of America, authorized by Act of Congress, July 2, 1926, takes pleasure in presenting a Second Bronze Oak Leaf Cluster in lieu of a Third Award of the Distinguished Flying Cross with Combat "V" to Lieutenant Colonel George Lamar Jones (AFSN: FR-4325A), United States Air Force, for heroism and extraordinary achievement while participating in aerial flight while pilot of an F-86 aircraft, 4th Fighter-Interceptor Wing, FIFTH Air Force, in action against enemies of the United Nations in Korea on 29 March 1953. While flying at 40,000 feet near the Yalu River, Colonel Jones, with his wingman, sighted two MiG's and made a right turn to intercept them. While making his move, the lone MiG moved under Colonel Jones into an attacking position. Skillfully maneuvering his aircraft, he dropped down and climbed under his would-be attacker. Utilizing his extensive knowledge of tactical gunnery, Colonel Jones closed to 800 feet and fired a burst that covered his target with hits, and resulted in the emanation of profuse amounts of smoke and flame. As the MiG began to disintegrate, the enemy pilot ejected himself, as his flaming aircraft crashed to the ground. By his actions, Colonel Jones became history's thirtieth Jet ACE. The tactical skill, and peerless gunnery Colonel Jones has employed in attaining this distinction has brought great credit upon himself and the United States Air Force.

See also
 List of Korean War flying aces

References

Sources

20th-century births
1997 deaths
American Korean War flying aces
Military personnel from New York City
Recipients of the Distinguished Flying Cross (United States)
Recipients of the Legion of Merit
Recipients of the Silver Star
United States Air Force officers
United States Army Air Forces pilots of World War II